George Bayer (September 15, 1925 – March 16, 2003) was an American professional golfer who played on the PGA Tour and the Senior PGA Tour.

Bayer was born in Bremerton, Washington. He attended the University of Washington and was a member of the football team from 1946–1949; he played in the 1949 East-West Shrine Game. After college, he was drafted by the Washington Redskins in the 20th round (253rd overall). He was released by the Redskins and played for the Brooklyn Brooks and Richmond Arrows of the minor league American Football League in 1950. Bayer did not begin playing golf professionally until he was 29 years old; he started in golf as a caddie at Kitsap Golf and Country Club, which is located between Silverdale, Washington and his hometown of Bremerton.

At 6-foot-5-inches tall and 230 pounds, the power that Bayer could generate was astonishing. He was known for booming 300-yard drives. Bayer won four times on the PGA Tour in a four-year period made remarkable by the fact that he played in an era of inconsistently wound balls; and laminated maple or persimmon clubs that were made for players of average height (5'9" tall) and build (160 pounds). His achievements came in an era when golf equipment was simply not available for extremely tall or extremely short people. He also won the par-3 contest at the Masters Tournament in 1963.

Bayer also played on the Senior PGA Tour. His best year on that circuit was 1984, when he finished 21st on the money list with $64,491 in earnings. His last appearance in competitive golf was at the 2002 Liberty Mutual Legends of Golf. Bayer suffered a fatal heart attack at home in Palm Springs, California while dining with his wife, golfer Bob Goalby and Goalby's wife.

Professional wins (6)

PGA Tour wins (4)

PGA Tour playoff record (2–2)

Other wins (1)
1973 Michigan Open

Senior wins (1)
1997 Liberty Mutual Legends of Golf – Demaret Division (with Jim Ferree)

References

External links

American male golfers
PGA Tour golfers
PGA Tour Champions golfers
Golfers from Washington (state)
Washington Huskies football players
People from Bremerton, Washington
1925 births
2003 deaths